Denzel Burke (born November 10, 2002) is an American football cornerback for the Ohio State Buckeyes.

Early years
Burke originally attended Brophy College Preparatory in Phoenix, Arizona before transferring to Saguaro High School in Scottsdale, Arizona for his senior year. He played defensive back and wide receiver in high school. He played in only one game his senior year due to injury. Burke committed to Ohio State University to play college football.

College career
Burke started all 13 games his true freshman year at Ohio State in 2021. He finished the year with 35 tackles, one interception and one touchdown.

References

External links
Ohio State Buckeyes bio

Living people
Players of American football from Arizona
American football cornerbacks
Ohio State Buckeyes football players
Year of birth missing (living people)